Andy Arnold García Sandoval (born August 1, 1995) is an American soccer player who currently plays as a midfielder for Chihuahua F.C.

Career
García spent the 2014 season with UACH F.C. before joining Deportivo Toluca, where he made his debut in a Copa MX match on 14 February 2017. He won the Serie A de México title with Alacranes de Durango during the Clausura 2022 season. In June 2022, García signed with new club Chihuahua F.C.

Career statistics

Club

Honours

Club
Alacranes de Durango
 Serie A de México: Clausura 2022

References

1995 births
Living people
American soccer players
American expatriate soccer players
Association football midfielders
UACH F.C. footballers
Deportivo Toluca F.C. players
Deportivo Toluca F.C. Premier players
La Piedad footballers
Alacranes de Durango footballers
Chihuahua F.C. footballers
Liga Premier de México players
Tercera División de México players
American expatriate sportspeople in Mexico
Expatriate footballers in Mexico
Soccer players from New Mexico
Sportspeople from Las Cruces, New Mexico